Edward Wrightington (born c. 1580) was an English lawyer and politician who sat in the House of Commons from 1621 to 1622.

Wrightington was the son of John of Wrightington of Lancashire. He matriculated at Brasenose College, Oxford, on 9 February 1594, aged 13. In 1621, he was elected member of parliament for St Mawes.  He was a bencher of Gray's Inn in 1637.

References

Births circa 1580
Year of death missing
Members of the pre-1707 English Parliament for constituencies in Cornwall
English MPs 1621–1622
English lawyers
Members of Gray's Inn